In Round 2, all eight teams play against each other. A total of 28 matches will be played in this round.

League table

Matches

Round 2 statistics

Scorers

Assists

Hat-tricks

 4 Player scored 4 goals

Clean sheets
Clean sheets by Club:
New Radiant SC (2)
Club All Youth Linkage (2)
Victory SC (2)
Maziya S&RC (2)
Club Eagles (1)
Vyansa (1)
VB Addu FC (1)
Club Valencia (0)
Clean sheets by goalkeepers:
Imran Mohamed (New Radiant SC) (2)
Ibrahim Siyad (Club All Youth Linkage) (2)
Lavent Vanli (Victory SC) (2)
Mohamed Imran (Maziya S&RC) (2)
Abdulla Ziyazan (VB Addu FC) (2)
Mohamed Yamaan (Club Eagles) (1)
Alexander Osei Domfeh (Vyansa) (1)
Ibrahim Ifrah Areef (Club Valencia) (0)
Hussain Habeeb (VB Addu FC) (0)
Mohamed Saruhan (Club Valencia) (0)
Mohamed Nishah (Victory SC) (0)

References

2